Rachel Kristine Bootsma (born December 15, 1993) is an American competition swimmer who specializes in the backstroke, and is an Olympic gold medalist.  Bootsma earned a gold medal as a member of the winning U.S. team in the 4×100-meter medley relay at the 2012 Summer Olympics, and also competed in the 100-meter backstroke.

Career

At the 2010 National Championships, the selection meet for both the 2010 Pan Pacific Swimming Championships and the 2011 World Aquatics Championships, Bootsma placed third in the 100-meter backstroke. At the 2010 Pan Pacific Swimming Championships, Bootsma earned a bronze medal in the 50-meter backstroke, tying with Emily Thomas of New Zealand and Fabiola Molina of Brazil.

On November 20, 2010, Bootsma set the national high school record in the 100-yard backstroke with a time of 51.53, bettering Cindy Tran's record of 51.85 (Bootsma's record has been since bettered). On October 16, 2011 at the Pan American Games, she broke the games' record in the 100-meter backstroke with a time of 1:00.37. Bootsma, known for her front speed, clocked a 29.56 on the way out before closing out the win with a 30.81 final 50 meters. The previous record was held by Elizabeth Pelton.

Bootsma graduated from Eden Prairie High School in Eden Prairie, Minnesota in 2012. She currently attends the University of California, Berkeley, where she swims for Teri McKeever's California Golden Bears women's swimming team. In 2013 and 2015, she was NCAA national champion in the 100-yard backstroke.

2012 Summer Olympics

At the 2012 U.S. Olympic Trials in Omaha, Nebraska, the U.S. qualifying meet for the Olympics, Bootsma earned a place on the U.S. Olympic team for the first time by finishing second behind Missy Franklin in the 100-meter backstroke with a time of 59.49.  In the heats and semi-finals, Bootsma posted times of 59.69 and 59.10, placing behind Franklin both times.  In placing second, she defeated her childhood idol, Natalie Coughlin, who finished third.

At the 2012 Summer Olympics in London, Bootsma posted a time of 1.00.03 in the heats for the 100-meter backstroke, finishing in eleventh place overall and qualifying for a place in the semifinals.  She then finished in sixth place of semi-final 2 with a time of 1.00.04, failing to gain a place in the final.  Bootsma earned a gold medal as a member of the winning U.S. team in the 4×100-meter medley relay.  She swam the backstroke leg in the preliminary races, helping the U.S. team win a spot in the final.

Personal bests
.

See also
 List of Olympic medalists in swimming (women)
 California Golden Bears

References

External links
 
 
 
 
 
 
  Rachel Bootsma – University of California athlete profile at CalBears.com
 

1993 births
Living people
American female backstroke swimmers
California Golden Bears women's swimmers
Olympic gold medalists for the United States in swimming
Pan American Games gold medalists for the United States
People from Eden Prairie, Minnesota
Swimmers at the 2011 Pan American Games
Swimmers at the 2012 Summer Olympics
Medalists at the 2012 Summer Olympics
Pan American Games medalists in swimming
Universiade medalists in swimming
Universiade bronze medalists for the United States
Medalists at the 2015 Summer Universiade
Medalists at the 2011 Pan American Games